W. Peyton Cunningham (October 20, 1901 – January 27, 1971) was an American politician. He served as a Democratic member of the Louisiana House of Representatives.

Life and career 
Cunningham was an attorney in Natchitoches, Louisiana.

In 1932, Cunningham was elected to the Louisiana House of Representatives, serving until 1940.

Cunningham died in January 1971, at the age of 69.

References 

1901 births
1971 deaths
Democratic Party members of the Louisiana House of Representatives
20th-century American politicians
Louisiana city attorneys